The Tassie Mariners is an under-18 Australian rules football club representing the state of Tasmania.  They currently play in the AFL Under 18 Championships and also played in the Victorian statewide under-18s competition (then known as the TAC Cup) from 1995 until 2002.

References

Australian rules football clubs in Tasmania
Former NAB League clubs